There have been two Polish noblewomen named Elzbieta Czartoryska:

Elżbieta Czartoryska (1736–1816)
Elżbieta Czartoryska (1905–1989)